The Andean slaty thrush (Turdus nigriceps) is a species of bird in the family Turdidae. It was formerly considered conspecific with the blacksmith thrush, with the combined species known as slaty thrush.

It is found in north-west Argentina, Bolivia, Ecuador and Peru. 

Its natural habitats are temperate forest, subtropical or tropical moist lowland forest, subtropical or tropical moist montane forest, and heavily degraded former forest.

References

Andean slaty thrush
Birds of Ecuador
Birds of the Yungas
Andean slaty thrush
Taxonomy articles created by Polbot